Robert Gellately (born 1943) is a Canadian academic and noted authority on the history of modern Europe, particularly during World War II and the Cold War era.

Education and career 
He earned his B.A., B.Ed., and M.A. degrees at Memorial University of Newfoundland and his Ph.D. at the London School of Economics.

He began his professional career at Cornell University, followed by positions at the University of Western Ontario and Clark University, where he was the Strassler Family Professor in Holocaust History. Since 2003, he has been the Earl Ray Beck Professor of History at Florida State University.

He often teaches classes about World War II and the Cold War, but his extensive interest in the Holocaust has led to his conducting research regarding other genocides as well. He is occasionally known to give lectures on specific genocides. Gellately has very strict guidelines for what he will deem a genocide, and has had several televised debates regarding his somewhat controversial views.

Research 
Gellately's most recent work is Stalin's Curse: Battling for Communism in War and Cold War (Knopf (March 5, 2013).
Gellately recently published a set of original documents by Leon Goldensohn dealing with the 1945–46 Nuremberg trials of war criminals in The Nuremberg Interviews: An American Psychiatrist's Conversations With The Defendants and Witnesses (Alfred A. Knopf, 2004).

His other books include Backing Hitler: Consent and Coercion in Nazi Germany, 1933–1945 (Oxford University Press, 2001). It has been published in German, Dutch, Spanish, Czech, Portuguese and Italian. Japanese and French translations are in press. Backing Hitler was chosen as a main selection for book clubs in North America and the United Kingdom.

In the book Backing Hitler: Consent and Coercion in Nazi Germany, 1933–1945, Gellately argues that the Gestapo were not in fact all-pervasive and intrusive as they have been described. The Gestapo only numbered 32,000 for the entire population of Germany, and this clearly limited their impact. In the city of Hanover there were only 42 officers. Instead, Gellately says that the atmosphere of terror and fear was maintained by 'denunciations' from ordinary Germans, whereby they would inform any suspicious 'anti-Nazi' activity to the local Nazi authority. According to Gellately, these denunciations were the cause of most prosecutions, as in Saarbrücken 87.5 per cent of cases of 'slander against the regime' came from denunciations. This diminished the Gestapo's role in maintaining fear and terror throughout the Third Reich, however they still proved to be a powerful instrument for Hitler and continued to provide the security apparatus needed for the Nazi Regime.

His first book was The Politics of Economic Despair: Shopkeepers in German Politics, 1890–1914 (London, 1974). In 1991 he published The Gestapo and German Society: Enforcing Racial Policy, 1933–1945 (Oxford University Press). It has been translated into German and Spanish.

In addition, Gellately has co-edited a volume of essays with Russian specialist Sheila Fitzpatrick, Accusatory Practices: Denunciation in Modern European History, 1789–1989 (University of Chicago Press, 1997). With his colleague Nathan Stoltzfus (also at Florida State University) he co-edited a collection called Social Outsiders in Nazi Germany (Princeton University Press, 2001). With Ben Kiernan, Director of the Genocide Studies program at Yale, he recently co-edited The Specter of Genocide: Mass Murder in Historical Perspective (Cambridge University Press, 2003).

Professor Gellately has won numerous research awards, including grants from the Alexander von Humboldt Foundation in Germany and the Social Sciences and Humanities Research Council of Canada. Many of the books written or edited by him are used as textbooks in college classrooms across the United States of America.

References

Selected works 
 Lenin, Stalin and Hitler: The Age of Social Catastrophe, Knopf, 2007,  
 "The Gestapo and German Society: Political Denunciation in the Gestapo Case Files," The Journal of Modern History Vol. 60, No. 4, December 1988.
 The Gestapo and German Society: Enforcing Racial Policy 1933-1945 (Oxford University Press, 1991)
 "Denunciations in Twentieth-Century Germany: Aspects of Self-Policing in the Third Reich and the German Democratic Republic," The Journal of Modern History Vol. 68, No. 4, December 1996.
 Coedited with Sheila Fitzpatrick, Accusatory Practices: Denunciation in Modern European History, 1789–1989 (University of Chicago Press, 1997)
 Backing Hitler: Consent and Coercion in Nazi Germany (Oxford University Press, 2002)
Stalin's Curse: Battling for Communism in War and Cold War (Vintage, 2013)
Hitler's True Believers: How Ordinary People Became Nazis (Oxford University Press, 2020)

External links 
 Florida State University faculty profile
 Interview with Gellately on "New Books in History"
 FSU professor's 'Lenin, Stalin, and Hitler' sheds new light on three of the 20th century's bloodiest rulers Barry Ray, Florida State University
 Professor Gellately on The George Jarkesy Show

Florida State University faculty
Living people
1943 births
People from Newfoundland (island)
20th-century Canadian historians
Canadian male non-fiction writers
Alumni of the London School of Economics
Memorial University of Newfoundland alumni
People from Tallahassee, Florida
Cornell University faculty
Academic staff of the University of Western Ontario
Clark University faculty
21st-century Canadian historians